= Guntra Kuzmina =

Latvian singer

Guntra Kuzmina is a Latvian singer and member of the group Borowa MC.
